Year 1276 (MCCLXXVI) was a leap year starting on Wednesday (link will display the full calendar) of the Julian calendar.

Events 
 By place 

 Europe 
 Spring – Sultan Abu Yusuf Yaqub ibn Abd al-Haqq and Muhammad II, ruler of Granada, agree to a truce with King Alfonso X (the Wise) for two years. Before Abu Yusuf leaves, Muhammad's secretary addresses a poem to Abu Yusuf, expressing fear of Castile's power and appealing for Marinid's continued support. Later, Abu Yusuf lands at Alcázar Seguir on January 19. This ending the first Marinid invasion in Al-Andalus (modern Spain).
 June – King Rudolf I declares war on his rival Ottokar II. After 6 months of campaigning, Ottokar surrenders all his lands (including Austria and Styria) except Bohemia and Moravia. Rudolf makes Vienna his capital, marking the beginning of the Habsburg Dynasty, which will last until 1918.

 England 
 Spring – King Edward I (Longshanks) orders the people of Bayonne in Gascony (as part of the only English possessions in France) to provide Castile with warships "to resist the Saracens by sea", but he excuses himself from personal participation against the Marinid invasion in Spain because of his wars in Wales and his plan to lead a Crusade to the Holy Land.

 Africa 
 Battle of Dongola: Mamluk forces led by Sultan Baibars gain a decisive victory against the Kingdom of Makuria. They capture the Makurian capital of Dongola and force King David of Makuria to flee upstream on the Nile. He seeks refuge in the Kingdom of Al-Abwab, but is handed over to Baibars, who has him executed. Later, Baibars conquers Al-Maris (Lower Nubia), previously a part of Makuria, and annexes it into Egypt.

 Asia 
 Spring – The court of the Southern Song Dynasty of China and hundreds of thousands of its citizens flee from Hangzhou to Fujian, and then Guangdong, in an effort to escape a Mongol invasion under Kublai Khan. 
 June 15 – Remnants of the Chinese Song court in Fuzhou province conduct the coronation ceremony for Prince Zhao Shi to become Emperor Duan Zong (until 1278).
 The mountain fortress Alamut Castle (Eagle's Nest) is again captured by the Mongols from a Nizari force under Shams al-Din Muhammad.Virani, Shafique N.; Assistant Professor Departments of Historical Studies and the Study of Religion Shafique N. (2007). The Ismailis in the Middle Ages: A History of Survival, a Search for Salvation, p. 32. Oxford University Press, USA. .

 The Americas 
 A severe 23-year drought begins to affect the Grand Canyon area, eventually forcing the agriculture-dependent Puebloans (or Anasazi) to migrate out of the region.

 By topic 

 Cities and Towns 
 March 9 – Augsburg is granted the status of an Imperial Free City. Later, Ravensburg also receives the status in the same year.

 Culture 
 Merton College, Oxford, is first recorded as having a collection of books, making its Library the world's oldest in continuous daily use.

 Economy 
 Henry of Ghent (or Henricus) becomes the last major theologian to openly consider annuities as a usurious contract. The end of the debate allows for the expansion of the budding practice of renten emission, to become a staple of public finance in northwestern Europe.

 Religion 
 January 10 – Pope Gregory X dies after a 4-year pontificate at Arezzo. He is succeeded by Innocent V as the 185th pope of the Catholic Church.
 June 22 – Innocent V dies after a 5-month reign at Rome. He is succeeded by Adrian V (or Hadrian) as the 186th pope of the Catholic Church.
 August 18 – Adrian V (or Hadrian) dies after a 2-month reign at Viterbo. He is succeeded by John XXI as the 187th pope of Rome (until 1277).
 The foundation stone of the Minoritenkirche in Vienna is laid by Ottokar II.

Births 
 February 21 – Thomas de Multon, English nobleman (d. 1313)
 May 3 – Louis of Évreux, son of Philip III (the Bold) (d. 1319)
 September 14 – Hugh de Courtenay, English nobleman (d. 1340) 
 September 29 – Christopher II, king of Denmark (d. 1332)
 October 4 – Margaret of Brabant, queen of Germany (d. 1311)
 October 19 – Hisaaki, Japanese prince and shogun (d. 1328)
 Agnes of Bavaria, German noblewoman and regent (d. 1345)
 Diederik II, German count of Limburg-Hohenlimburg (d. 1364)
 Humphrey de Bohun, English nobleman and knight (d. 1322)
 Ichijō Uchisane, Japanese nobleman and regent (d. 1304)
 Margaret of Lusignan, queen of Cilician Armenia (d. 1296)
 Matilda of Brunswick-Lüneburg, German co-ruler (d. 1318)
 Maurice de Moravia (or Moray), Scottish nobleman (d. 1346)
 Najm ad-Din al-Tufi, Persian scholar and theologian (d. 1316)
 Robert of Anjou, king of Naples (House of Capet) (d. 1343)
 Thomas Dagworth, English nobleman and knight (d. 1350)
 Vakhtang III, king of Georgia (House of Bagrationi) (d. 1308)

Deaths 
 January 10 – Gregory X, pope of the Catholic Church (b. 1210)
 January 24 – Walram II of Nassau, German nobleman (b. 1220)
 March 26 – Margaret of Holland, Dutch noblewoman (b. 1234)
 May 11 – Zaynaddin ibn al-Ajami, Ayyubid scholar (b. 1195)
 June 22 – Innocent V, pope of the Catholic Church (b. 1220)
 June 27 – Henry of Antioch, Outremer nobleman (b. 1217)
 July 27 – James I (the Conqueror), king of Aragon (b. 1208)
 August 18 – Adrian V, pope of the Catholic Church (b. 1215)
 September 6 – Vicedomino de Vicedominis, Italian cardinal
 November 30 – Hōjō Sanetoki, Japanese nobleman (b. 1224)
 Ahmad al-Badawi, Almohad Sufi scholar and mystic (b. 1200)
 Benedict III, Hungarian priest, vice-chancellor and archbishop
 Ela Longespee, English noblewoman and co-heiress (b. 1244)
 Gerardo of Borgo San Donnino, Italian friar, scholar and writer
 Guido Guinizelli, Italian poet and founder of Dolce Stil Novo 
 Louis of France, French prince and heir apparent (b. 1264)
 Hamuro Mitsutoshi, Japanese nobleman and poet (b. 1203)
 Mathilde of Saarbrücken, German noblewoman and regent
 Najm al-Din al-Qazwini al-Katibi, Persian scholar and writer
 Rolandino of Padua, Italian scholar, jurist and writer (b. 1200)
 Vasily of Kostroma, Grand Prince of Vladimir-Suzdal (b. 1241)

References